Les Groves is a former association football player who represented New Zealand at international level.

Groves played two official A-international matches for the All Whites in 1933 against trans-Tasman neighbours Australia as part of a 13 match tour, the first a 2–4 loss on 5 June 1933, his second another 2–4 loss on 24 June.

References

Year of birth missing (living people)
Living people
New Zealand association footballers
New Zealand international footballers
Association footballers not categorized by position